Nissae Isen (born March 3, 1997) is a Canadian voice actress who has voiced prominent young male characters in several television series, including BG's younger brother George in Miss BG from 2005 to 2008, Yuri from My Big Big Friend from 2011 to 2014 for which she received a 2012 nomination for "Best Performance in a Voice-Over Role" in the 33rd Young Artist Awards for her work in 2011 episodes, and the Canadian-accented voice of Trollee (the UK-accented was done by Samantha Reynolds) as one of the principal cast members of Mike the Knight, for which she received a "Best Performance in a Voice-Over Role" nomination in the 34th Young Artist Awards in 2013 for her work on 2012 episodes.

She has also voiced less prominent female characters, including Juanita, the Galactic Guardian younger sister of Paloma in Season 2 of Atomic Betty in 2006, Ivy from Miss Spider's Sunny Patch Friends in 2007, Will's younger sister Kate from Will and Dewitt from 2007 to 2008 and Jade Gibble from My Friend Rabbit from 2007 to 2008. She voiced the adult version of DW Read in the Arthur series finale "All Grown Up".

Minor male characters include a little penguin from Harry and His Bucket Full of Dinosaurs and Thor Powell from Captain Flamingo in 2006.

She is the younger sister of voice actress/singer Tajja Isen and is of Trinidadian descent.

References

External links

1997 births
Living people
Actresses from Toronto
Black Canadian actresses
Canadian people of Trinidad and Tobago descent
Canadian voice actresses